Lejeunea cavifolia is a species of liverwort belonging to the family Lejeuneaceae.

Synonym:
  Jungermannia cavifolia Ehrh.

References

Lejeuneaceae